Cerro Azul ("blue hill" in Spanish and Portuguese) may mean any of several different places:

Cerro Azul, Veracruz, in Mexico
Cerro Azul, Panama
Cerro Azul, Peru
Cerro Azul, Paraná, Brazil 
Cerro Azul, Misiones, Argentina 
Cerro Azul (Ecuador volcano), a volcano in the Galapagos
Cerro Azul (Chile volcano), a volcano in Chile, aka Quizapu